Robyn Hurder (born January 1, 1982) is an American musical theater actress. She is best known for originating the role of Nini in the stage adaptation of Moulin Rouge! on Broadway, a performance for which she was nominated for the 2020 Tony Award for Best Featured Actress in a Musical.

She has performed in the Broadway shows Nice Work If You Can Get It (2012–2013), Grease (2007–2008), The Wedding Singer (2006), and Chitty Chitty Bang Bang (2005). She has taken part in a number of regional productions and Encores! stagings, and the national tours of A Chorus Line (2010), Spamalot (2006), and Starlight Express (2003–2004).

Personal life 
Born in New Hampshire, Hurder grew up in Windham, Maine outside of Portland. A dancer and singer growing up, she attended the University of New Hampshire for two years before moving to New York City to pursue musical theater. She is married to fellow Broadway performer Clyde Alves.

Acting credits

Stage

Filmography

Awards

References

External links 
 
 Robyn Hurder on IBDb
 Robyn Hurder on IOBDb

21st-century American actresses
1982 births
Actresses from Maine
American musical theatre actresses
People from Nashua, New Hampshire
People from Windham, Maine
University of New Hampshire alumni
Living people